The Bhadbhut barrage or Bhadbhut dam is an under construction barrage on Narmada river near Bhadbhut village in Bharuch district, Gujarat, India. The construction started on 7 August 2020 and will be completed by 2025.

History 
The tender for construction of barrage and associated works was opened in June 2018. A joint venture of Dilip Buildcon and HCC was awarded the design and construction contract in July 2020. The project will cost . The project period is 48 months. On 7 August 2020, Chief Minister of Gujarat Vijay Rupani flagged off the construction. It will be completed by 2025.

Features 
The project is a part of envisaged Kalpasar Project. The project is tendered by the Narmada Water Resources, Water Supply and Kalpsar Department of Government of Gujarat.

The barrage will be constructed 25 km upstream of river mouth where it enters the Gulf of Khambhat in Arabian sea and 125 km downstream of Sardar Sarovar dam. A 1.663 km long causeway-cum-weir barrage will be constructed. It will form a reservoir holding 599 MCM of fresh water. The barrage will have 90 gates. A six-lane bridge will be also constructed on the barrage which will connect Dahej and Hazira with reduced distance of 18 km. Total  of the land in 14 villages will be acquired to built the flood protection embankment on both banks of the river. The north and south bank embankments were 14 km-long and 4 metre high while south bank embankment will be 27 km-long and 8 metre high.

The barrage will provide fresh water for drinking, agriculture and industries in the region as well stop ingress of seawater. It will also have separate channel for fishing activities.

Some local fishermen opposed the project citing that the fish population will decrease due to barrage.

References

External links
 

Bharuch district
Dams in Gujarat
Gravity dams
Dams on the Narmada River